Could've Been may refer to:

 "Could've Been (H.E.R. song)", a song by H.E.R.
 "Could've Been (Tiffany song)", a song by Tiffany

See also
 "Could've Been Me", a song by Billy Ray Cyrus
 "Could've Been You", a song by Cher